Arkansas Highway 183 (AR 183, Ark. 183, and Hwy. 183) is a designation for a state highway in the U.S. state of Arkansas. The route begins at AR 35 in Benton, and ends at AR 5 in Bryant, just north of Interstate 30 (I-30).

Route description 

The southern terminus for AR 183 begins at AR 35 in Benton. The route heads almost directly west, and travels through the town of Bauxite, before turning towards the north. The route travels through downtown Bryant, and intersects I-30 shortly after. Just past I-30, AR 183 reaches its northern terminus at AR 5.

Major intersections

References

External links

183
 Transportation in Saline County, Arkansas